The 2020–21 Big Bash League season or BBL|10 was the tenth season of the Big Bash League, the professional men's Twenty20 domestic cricket competition in Australia, with 61 matches played. On 15 July 2020, Cricket Australia confirmed the fixtures for the tournament. The tournament started on 10 December 2020, and finished on 6 February 2021, with the majority of the matches played at night.

The Sydney Sixers were the defending champions, and they successfully defended their title following a 27-run victory over the Perth Scorchers in the final.

New rules
Several changes for the season, including bonus points, substitutions and free hits for wides, were suggested by Cricket Australia. However, on 16 November 2020, Cricket Australia announced three changes to the BBL's playing conditions, which will add a more strategic element to the T20 tournament. All three rules are designed to maximise interest throughout the full 40 overs of a contest and ensure strategic thinking is rewarded. The three new rules are as follows:

Power Surge

The 'Power Surge' is a two-over period during which the fielding team is allowed only two players outside the inner fielding circle. The batting side can call for this at any point from the 11th over of their innings. The fielding restrictions replicate those of the usual Powerplay at the beginning of an innings, which has been shortened to four overs.

The X-factor

An 'X-factor Player', named as either the 12th or 13th player on the team sheet, can come into the game beyond the 10th over of the first innings and replace any player who is yet to bat, or has bowled no more than one over. The X-factor substitute was first used in the game eight of the tournament, on 15 December 2020. The Adelaide Strikers replaced Danny Briggs with Matthew Short, and the Hobart Hurricanes replaced Johan Botha with Mac Wright.

Bash Boost

The 'Bash Boost' will be a bonus point awarded halfway through the second innings. The team chasing will receive the bonus point if they're above the equivalent 10-over score of their opposition, while if they're trailing, the fielding side will receive the point. If the score at the 10-over mark is equal, both teams will get 0.5 points each. In case of a no result, both teams are given two points each and no Bash Boost is awarded. If a match has been shortened before a ball is bowled, the midway point of the innings is recalculated and points are given to who was above during the midway point. If a match is impacted by rain and is shortened, the Bash Boost target will be calculated via the DLS method. Teams will also now be awarded three points for winning the match, as opposed to the traditional two.

Teams 

Due to the COVID-19 pandemic, teams will play 'home' games at neutral venues. These are marked with an *.

Points table

Win–loss table
Below is a summary of results for each team's fourteen regular season matches, plus finals where applicable, in chronological order. A team's opponent for any given match is listed above the margin of victory/defeat.

Last updated: 20 February 2021

Fixtures
On 23 November 2020, Cricket Australia confirmed the full schedule for the tournament. 45 of the 61 games – including all the finals – were shown on Channel Seven, while Fox Cricket and Kayo Sports broadcast all of the matches. On 5 November 2020, Cricket Australia announced the revised dates, start times and matchups for all 56 regular season games, with venues confirmed for the first 21 matches up until 31 December 2020.

Playoffs

Eliminator

Qualifier

Knockout

Challenger

Final

References

External links
 Official website
 Series home at ESPN Cricinfo

Big Bash League seasons
Big Bash League
Big Bash League